Conus locumtenens, common name the vice admiral cone, is a species of sea snail, a marine gastropod mollusk in the family Conidae, the cone snails and their allies.

Like all species within the genus Conus, these snails are predatory and venomous. They are capable of "stinging" humans, therefore live ones should be handled carefully or not at all.

Subspecies
 Conus locumtenens assilorenzoi (Cossignani & Assi, 2016)
 Conus locumtenens biggii (Cossignani & Assi, 2016)
 Conus locumtenens linae (Cossignani & Assi, 2016)
 Conus locumtenens locumtenens Blumenbach, 1791

Description
The size of an adult shell varies between 30 mm and 66 mm. The spire is channeled and concavely elevated. The color of the shell is yellowish or pink-white, with a network of chestnut or chocolate. It is sometimes indistinctly banded, with lines of spots on the bands. The aperture is generally rose-tinted.

Distribution
This species occurs in the Red Sea, the Gulf of Aden and in the Indian Ocean off Somalia.

References

 Sowerby, G. B., III. 1895. Descriptions of nine new species of shells. Proceedings of the Malacological Society of London 1(5):214–217, pl. 13.
 Filmer R.M. (2001). A Catalogue of Nomenclature and Taxonomy in the Living Conidae 1758 – 1998. Backhuys Publishers, Leiden. 388pp
 Tucker J.K. (2009). Recent cone species database. September 4, 2009 Edition
 Tucker J.K. & Tenorio M.J. (2009) Systematic classification of Recent and fossil conoidean gastropods. Hackenheim: Conchbooks. 296 pp
 Puillandre N., Duda T.F., Meyer C., Olivera B.M. & Bouchet P. (2015). One, four or 100 genera? A new classification of the cone snails. Journal of Molluscan Studies. 81: 1–23

Gallery
Below are several color forms:

External links
 The Conus Biodiversity website
 
Cone Shells – Knights of the Sea

locumtenens
Gastropods described in 1791